"Bridesicle" is a 2009 science fiction short story by Will McIntosh, exploring the conjunction of suspended animation and forced marriage. It was originally published in Asimov's Science Fiction.

Synopsis
Eighty years after her death in a car accident, Mira awakens in a 'dating center'. The patrons of the dating center are lonely men seeking wives, and dead women in cryogenic storage. A male patron can revive a female patron's head and interview her — and, if he doesn't like her, press a button to immediately return her to storage. As various suitors reject her, and the years go by, Mira's only chance to avoid being frozen forever is to convince a total stranger that she loves him enough that he should pay for her full revival. However, Mira is a lesbian, and does not want to marry a man.

Critical reception

"Bridesicle" won both the 2010 Hugo Award for Best Short Story and the 2010 Asimov's Reader Poll, along with being a finalist for that year's Nebula Award.

History
McIntosh had originally tried writing the story from the vantage point of a man who would regularly visit the dating center but be unable to afford a full revival; however, Mary Robinette Kowal suggested that the story would work better from the perspective of a woman trapped within the center.

Expansion
In 2013, Orbit Books published Love Minus Eighty, McIntosh's novel-length expansion of "Bridesicle".

References

2009 short stories
Cryonics in fiction
LGBT speculative fiction
LGBT short stories
Hugo Award for Best Short Story winning works
Science fiction short stories
2000s LGBT literature
Lesbian fiction